István Bernáth (born 28 January 1989) is a Hungarian professional boxer. As an amateur, he won a silver medal in the super-heavyweight division at the 2008 EU Championships and at the 2009 EU Championships.

In 2021 Bernath started his professional career.

Amateur career

International highlights

 2008 – EUBC European Union Championships (Cetniewo, Poland) 2rd place – +91 kg
 Finals: Lost to David Price (England)
 2009 – EUBC European Union Championships (Odense, Denmark) 2rd place – +91 kg
 Finals: Lost to John Jones (Wales)
2010 – European Amateur Boxing Championships (Moscow, Russia) 5rd place – +91 kg
 1/4: Lost to Viktar Zuyev (Belarus) 2:10
2011 – European Amateur Boxing Championships (Ankara, Turkey) 5rd place – +91 kg
 1/4: Lost to Roberto Cammarelle (Italy) 6:18
2012 – AIBA European Olympic Qualification Tournament (Trabzon, Turkey) 4th place – +91 kg
 1/8: Defeated Roman Marynovski (Israel) 16:9
 1/4: Defeated Labinot Xhoxhaj (Slovenia) 14:4
 1/2: Lost to Tony Yoka (France) 2:12

2013 – AIBA World Boxing Championships (Almaty, Kazakhstan) 7rd place – +91 kg
 1/16: Defeated Alen Beganović (Montenegro) TKO
 1/8: Lost to Ivan Dychko (Kazakhstan) 0:3
2015 – European Games (Baku, Azerbaijan) 7rd place – +91 kg
 1/16: Defeated Petar Belberov (Bulgaria) 3:0
 1/8: Lost to Tony Yoka (France) 0:3
2016 – AIBA European Olympic Qualification Tournament (Samsun, Turkey) 4th place – +91 kg
 1/8: Defeated Tim Jevscek (Slovenia) TKO
 1/4: Defeated Petar Belberov (Bulgaria) 3:0
 1/2: Lost to Joseph Joyce (Great Britain) TKO 3
 Olympic box-off: Lost to Ali Eren Demirezen (Turkey) WO

Professional boxing record

References

External links

Amateur results.
Istvan Bernath  at World Series of Boxing.

1989 births
Living people
Hungarian male boxers
Super-heavyweight boxers
Boxers from Budapest